Mickey's Movies is a 1928 silent short film in Larry Darmour's Mickey McGuire series starring a young Mickey Rooney. Directed by Albert Herman, the two-reel short was released to theaters on September 2, 1928 by FBO.

Plot
Excitement arrives in the town of Toonerville, when a movie is being shot on location in front of the Scorpion's clubhouse. After kicking the film crew off of the property, Mickey and his Gang make their own movie with the aid of a 'scenario' that Mickey recently wrote.

Notes
In this film, the principal kids are aided by a new character, "Little Chocolate" (played by child actress Hannah Washington). This may have been this character's only appearance in the series. It seems likely that "Little Chocolate"'s addition to the Gang in this film had to do with the fact that Hambone (Jimmy Robinson) has a smaller part.
In this film, it is revealed that the character of "Katrink'" is the younger brother of "The Mighty Katrinka", the latter of whom was one of the original characters from the Toonerville Trolley comics.

Cast
Mickey Rooney - Mickey McGuire
Jimmy Robinson - Hambone Johnson
Delia Bogard - Tomboy Taylor
Hannah Washington - Little Chocolate
Unknown - Katrink
Buddy Brown - Stinky Davis
Kendall McComas - Scorpions member

External links 
 

1928 films
1928 comedy films
American black-and-white films
American silent short films
Mickey McGuire short film series
1928 short films
Silent American comedy films
American comedy short films
1920s American films